Rhopobota toshimai is a species of moth of the family Tortricidae. It is found in Taiwan and Japan.

The wingspan is 13–17 mm.

References

Moths described in 1978
Eucosmini